Raymond Nègre was a French art director active in the film industry during the 1940s, 1950s and 1960s.

Selected filmography
 My First Love (1945)
 Resistance (1945)
 Not So Stupid (1946)
 Women's Games (1946)
 Devil's Daughter (1946)
 The Village of Wrath (1947)
 Three Boys, One Girl (1948)
 The Heart on the Sleeve (1948)
 The Chocolate Girl (1950)
 Mademoiselle Josette, My Woman (1950)
 We Will All Go to Paris (1950)
 Bernard and the Lion (1951)
 Jocelyn (1952)
 Wonderful Mentality (1953)
 After You Duchess (1954)
 Four Days in Paris (1955)
 In the Manner of Sherlock Holmes (1956)
 Love in Jamaica (1957)

References

Bibliography 
 Hayward, Susan. Simone Signoret: The Star as Cultural Sign. Continuum, 2004.

External links 
 

Year of birth unknown
Year of death unknown
French art directors